Iriothyrsa is a genus of moths, belonging to the family Coleophoridae containing only one species, Iriothyrsa melanogma, which is known from South Africa.

References

Endemic moths of South Africa
Coleophoridae
Moths of Africa